Boualem Amine Mesmoudi (born 15 April 1994) is an Algerian footballer who plays for MC Alger.

Career
In 2019, he signed a contract with MC Oran.
In 2021, he signed a contract with ES Sahel.
In 2022, he signed a contract with Al-Wakrah SC. On 2 July 2022, Mesmoudi Signed a two-years contract with MC Alger.

Honours

Club
 USM Bel Abbès
 Algerian Super Cup (1): 2018

References

External links
 

Living people
1994 births
Footballers from Oran
Association football defenders
Algerian footballers
Algerian expatriate footballers
ASM Oran players
USM Bel Abbès players
MC Oran players
Étoile Sportive du Sahel players
Al-Wakrah SC players
Algerian Ligue Professionnelle 1 players
Tunisian Ligue Professionnelle 1 players
Qatar Stars League players
21st-century Algerian people
Expatriate footballers in Tunisia
Expatriate footballers in Qatar
Algerian expatriate sportspeople in Tunisia
Algerian expatriate sportspeople in Qatar